Luiz Carlos Bresser-Pereira (born 30 June 1934) is a Brazilian economist and social scientist. He teaches at the Getulio Vargas Foundation, in São Paulo. Since 1981, he has been the editor of the Brazilian Journal of Political Economy.

Bresser-Pereira served as the Minister of Finance of Brazil in 1987, under the Presidency of José Sarney, and helped propose what would eventually become the Plan Brady which solved the country's foreign debt crisis. He also served as the Minister of Federal Administration and Reform from 1995 to 1998 and the Minister of Science and Technology in 1999. His career as an economist was focused, on the theoretical side, on developmentalism, development macroeconomics, the methodological critique of neoclassical economics, the theory of the democratic, social, and developmental state, and on the critique of neoliberalism; and, on the applied side, the Economy of Brazil and its society.

Career 

Luiz Carlos Bresser-Pereira was born in 1934 in São Paulo. His bachelor's degree was in Law by the University of São Paulo (1957); his MBA, by Michigan State University (1960); his PhD (1974) and his Livre Docência in Economics (1984), by University of São Paulo. He teaches at the Getulio Vargas Foundation since 1962. He was visiting professor at the (Pantheon-Sorbonne University)(1977), at the École des Hautes Études en Sciences Sociales (2003-2010), and at the University of São Paulo (1989 and 2002–03). He was also visiting fellow at Oxford University in Nuffield College and St Antony's College in 1999 and 2001.

From 1963 to 1982, while keeping his academic activities, he was vice-president of Pão de Açucar Supermarkets (GPA (company)); he participated from the opening of its second story, in 1963; in 1982 the firm had become the largest retail chain in Brazil. In 1983, when Brazil was beginning to democratize, he entered public life, first as president of the Bank of the State of São Paulo (1983–84). In 1985 and 1986, he was chief of staff of the governor of São Paulo, André Franco Montoro. In 1987, he became Finance Minister of Brazil in the José Sarney administration. After leaving the ministry, he participated from the foundation of the Brazilian Social Democracy Party - PSDB. Between 1995 and 1998, he was Minister of Federal Administration and Reform of the State and, in 1999 Minister of Science, Technology and Innovation, both under the Fernando Henrique Cardoso  administration. Since 1999 he is full-time academic professor. In 2010 he left the PSDB with the argument that the political party had turned conservative.

As Finance Minister (1987) 

In 1987 he assumed the Ministry of Finance (Brazil) a moment of deep crisis that followed the failure of the economic bubble that eventually was the Cruzado Plan: high inflation resumed at 15% a month, business firms and the federate states were bankrupt. Negotiations with IMF and fiscal adjustment were seen by politicians in power as unacceptable. Nevertheless, Bresser prepared a "Macroeconomic Adjustment Plan", which proposed a fiscal adjustment that was understood as a condition for the control of inflation. Second, he prepared and adopted what came to be called the "Bresser Plan" - a price freeze that included fiscal adjustment and the neutralization of the inertial inflation, which eventually didn't work.
Third, he developed a plan based on the securitization of the foreign debt and the relative de-linkage of commercial banks and IMF in the negotiation process, which would be rejected by the secretary of the Treasury, James Baker, but 18 months later, would be the Brady Plan that led to a close the foreign debt crisis.

As Minister of Federal Administration and Reform of the State (MARE) (1995-98) 

With the election of Fernando Henrique Cardoso to the presidency of Brazil, Bresser-Pereira assumed the Ministry of Federal Administration and Reform of the State (MARE). He understood that Brazil's civil service reform had already been made since the 1930s and initiated the managerial reform of the state.  He elaborated a white paper, the "Plano Diretor da Reforma do Aparelho do Estado", and developed a theoretical framework for this reform, which, on the managerial perspective, was based on management by results, on competition for excellence between the state organizations, and on a formal system of social accountability and, on the structural perspective, on the creation of the "social organizations" – non-profit private organizations to which the state should transfer its large social and scientific services that don't involve the use of state power. He also proposed an amendment to the chapter on the public administration of the 1988 Constitution. This managerial reform of the state is happening in Brazil, mainly at state and municipal levels, but also at the federal level, while a large number of social organizations continue to be created. The Brazilian 1999 managerial reform turned into an international reference. The books and papers that Bresser-Pereira wrote on the subject turned the main element in the courses on public administration offered by the Brazilian universities. Several Master and PhD dissertations have been written on the reform. While in MARE, Bresser-Pereira was also president of :es:Centro Latinoamericano de Administración para el Desarrollo - CLAD between 1995 and 1997. In his term, he gave to the managerial reform a Latin American dimension, and with the same objective, he organized the first yearly congress of CLAD, which is today CLAD's key activity.

As Minister of Science and Technology (1999) 

In the Ministry of Science, Technology and Innovation (Brazil) Bresser-Pereira defined the policy of transforming the research funds originated from the state-owned enterprises recently privatized into Sectorial Funds attached to the National Fund for Scientific and Technological Development (FNDCT). In order to achieve a better integration between the Ministry and its main agency, National Council for Scientific and Technological Development - CNPq, that he also presided it. Bresser-Pereira unified the academic curriculum vitae (CV) that the Federal Government requires for the evaluation of researchers under the name of Lattes Platform.

Academic Work 

He teaches economics at Getulio Vargas Foundation since 1962, where he became Emeritus Professor in 2005. In 1996 created in the Foundation, in São Paulo, the first master program on business administration in Brazil. He founded and is the editor of the Revista de Economia Política / Brazilian Journal of Political Economy since 1981. He is frequent contributor to newspapers, particularly to Folha de S.Paulo.
His mains contributions on economic theory are the historical model of growth and distribution with three types of technical progress, the theory of the inertial inflation, the methodological critique to neoclassical economics, and the theories and models forming new developmentalism and developmental macroeconomics. 
In political and social theory he worked on the rise of the technobureaucratic or professional class, on the theory of the modern state, and on the relation between democracy and economic development or the capitalist revolution. Since 2001 he is involved in defining new developmentalism – an ambitious project involving a macroeconomics, a political economy, and the draft of a microeconomics.

Selected books 

 Development and Crisis in Brazil, Westview Press, 1984. .
 A Sociedade Estatal e a Tecnoburocracia - State Society and Technobureaucracy, Editora Brasiliense, 1981.
 Lucro, Acumulação e Crise [Profit, Accumulation and Crisis], Editora Brasiliense, 1986. .
 The Theory of Inertial Inflation, with Yoshiaki Nakano, Lynne Rienner Publishers, 1987. .
 Economic Reforms in New Democracies, with José María Maravall e Adam Przeworski, Cambridge University Press, 1993. .
 Democracy and Public Management Reform, Oxford University Press. .
 Developing Brazil: Overcoming the Failure of the Washington Consensus, Lynne Rienner Publishers, 2009. .
 Globalization and Competition, Cambridge University Press, 2010.
 Developmental Macroeconomics, with Nelson Marconi and José Luis Oreiro, Routledge, London: Routledge, 2014.
 The Political Construction of Brazil: Society, Economy, and State Since Independence, to be published by Lynne Rienner Publishers, 2016. ISBN 978-1- 62637-307-5.(predicted)
Bresser-Pereira has a large number of papers public in journals and edited books.

Selected papers (not republished in the books) 

 Bresser-Pereira, Luiz Carlos (1982[1984]) "Six interpretations on the Brazilian social formation", Latin American Perspectives 11(1): 35–72, Winter 1984.
 Bresser-Pereira, Luiz Carlos (2002) "Citizenship and res publica: the emergence of republican rights", Citizenship Studies 6(2) 2002: 145–164.
 Bresser-Pereira, Luiz Carlos (2009) "The two methods and the hard core of economics", Journal of Post Keynesian Economics 31 (3) Spring: 493–522.
 Bresser-Pereira, Luiz Carlos (2010) "The global financial crisis, neoclassical economics, and the neoliberal years of capitalism", Revue de la Régulation 7, Spring 2010: 1-29.
 Bresser-Pereira (2011) "From the national-bourgeoisie to the dependency interpretation of Latin America", Latin American Perspectives 178, vol. 38 (3), May 2011: 40–58.
 Bresser-Pereira, Luiz Carlos (2012) "Democracy and capitalist revolution", Économie Appliquée 65 (4): 111–139.

Books on his academic work 

 Em Busca do Novo [In Search of the New], edited by Yoshiak Nakano, Furquim and José Marcio Rego, Rio de Janeiro: Editora da Fundação Getulio Vargas, 2005. .
 A Teoria Econômica na Obra de Bresser-Pereira [Economic Theory on the Work of Bresser-Pereira], edited by José Luis Oreiro, Luiz Fernando de Paula and Nelson Marconi. Santa Maria, RS: Editora da UFSM, 2015. .
 Citations in Google Scholar: 22161
Additional papers on Bresser-Pereira's academic work are in his website: http://www.bresserpereira.org.br.

Honors and distinctions 

 1997 – Honorary Knight Commander of The Most Excellent Order of the British Empire
 2005 – Emeritus Professor, by the Getulio Vargas Foundation.
 2010 – Doctor Honoris Causae, by the University of Buenos Aires.
 2012 - James Street Scholar, by the Association for Evolutionary Economics.
 2015 – Juca Pato Prize (:pt:Prêmio Juca Pato), as the 2014 intellectual of the year, by the Brazilian Association of Writers (União Brasileira de Escritores - UBE).
 2017 - Title of Emeritus Researcher of CNPq (Applied Social Sciences). Delivery will be held on May 9, 2017.

Sites
 http://www.bresserpereira.org.br
 http://www.bjpe.org.br
 http://www.rep.org.br

References

Notes

External links 
 Economic Reforms in New Democracies A Social-Democratic Approach
 Democracy and Public Management Reform
 Developing Brazil: Overcoming the Failure of the Washington Consensus
 Globalization and Competition 
 Democracy and Public Management Reform
 Developmental Macroeconomics
 The Political Construction of Brazil: Society, Economy, and State Since Independence
 Latin American Perspectives.
 Citizenship and Res Publica : The Emergence of Republican Rights.
 The two methods and the hard core of economias.
 The global financial crisis, neoclassical economics, and the neoliberal years of capitalismo.
 Journal Articles.
 Bresser-Pereira Curiculum Lattes CNPq.
 Finance Minister of Brazil
 Bresser-Pereira as president of CNPq.
 Bresser-Pereira as president of CLAD.
 Interview of Bresser-Pereira.
 Professor at Getulio Vargas Foundation.
 Professor at École des Hautes Études en Sciences Sociales.
 Visiting Professor at the University of São Paulo 

Finance Ministers of Brazil
Brazilian economists
Brazilian social scientists
1934 births
Living people
Honorary Knights Commander of the Order of the British Empire
Ministers of Science and Technology of Brazil